The International Society for Music Information Retrieval (ISMIR) is an international forum for research on the organization of music-related data. It started as an informal group steered by an ad hoc committee in 2000 which established a yearly symposium - whence "ISMIR", which meant International Symposium on Music Information Retrieval. It was turned into a conference in 2002 while retaining the acronym. ISMIR was incorporated in Canada on July 4, 2008.

Purpose
Given the tremendous growth of digital music and music metadata in recent years, methods for effectively extracting, searching, and organizing music information have received widespread interest from academia and the information and entertainment industries. The purpose of ISMIR is to provide a venue for the exchange of news, ideas, and results through the presentation of original theoretical or practical work. By bringing together researchers and developers, educators and librarians, students and professional users, all working in fields that contribute to this multidisciplinary domain, the conference also serves as a discussion forum, provides introductory and in-depth information on specific domains, and showcases current products.

As the term Music Information Retrieval (MIR)  indicates, this research is motivated by the desire to provide music lovers, music professionals and music industry with robust, effective and usable methods and tools to help them locate, retrieve and experience the music they wish to have access to. MIR is a truly interdisciplinary area, involving researchers from the disciplines of musicology, cognitive science, library and information science, computer science, electrical engineering and many others.

Annual conferences
Since its inception in 2000, ISMIR has been the world’s leading forum for research on the modelling, creation, searching, processing and use of musical data. Researchers across the globe meet at the annual conference conducted by the society. It is known by the same acronym as the society, ISMIR. Following is the list of previous conferences held by the society.

 ISMIR 2021, 8-12 November 2021, Online
 ISMIR 2020, 12-16 October 2020, Online
 ISMIR 2019, 4-8 November 2019, Delft (The Netherlands)
 ISMIR 2018, 23–27 September 2018, Paris (France)
 ISMIR 2017, 23–27 October 2017, Suzhou (China) proceedings
 ISMIR 2016, 8–12 August 2016, New York City (USA) proceedings
 ISMIR 2015, 26–30 October 2015, Malaga (Spain) proceedings
 ISMIR 2014, 27–31 October 2014, Taipei (Taiwan) proceedings
 ISMIR 2013, 4–8 November 2013, Curitiba (Brazil) proceedings
 ISMIR 2012, 8–12 October 2012, Porto (Portugal) proceedings
 ISMIR 2011, 24–28 October 2011, Miami (USA) proceedings
 ISMIR 2010, 9–13 August 2010, Utrecht (The Netherlands) proceedings
 ISMIR 2009, 26–30 October 2009, Kobe (Japan) proceedings
 ISMIR 2008, 14–18 September 2008, Philadelphia (USA) proceedings
 ISMIR 2007, 23–30 September 2007, Vienna (Austria) proceedings
 ISMIR 2006, 8–12 October 2006, Victoria, BC (Canada) proceedings
 ISMIR 2005, 11–15 September 2005, London (UK) proceedings
 ISMIR 2004, 10–15 October 2004, Barcelona (Spain) proceedings
 ISMIR 2003, 26–30 October 2003, Baltimore, Maryland (USA) proceedings
 ISMIR 2002, 13–17 October 2002, Paris (France) proceedings
 ISMIR 2001, 15–17 October 2001, Bloomington, Indiana (USA) proceedings
 ISMIR 2000, 23–25 October 2000, Plymouth, Massachusetts (USA) proceedings

The official webpage provides a more up-to-date information on past and future conferences and provides access to all past websites and to the cumulative database of all papers, posters and tutorials presented at these conferences. An overview of all papers published at ISMIR can be found at DBLP.

Research areas and topics
The following list gives an overview of the main research areas and topics that are within the scope of 
Music Information Retrieval.

MIR data and fundamentals
    music signal processing
    symbolic music processing
    metadata, linked data and semantic web
    social tags and user generated data
    natural language processing, text and web mining
    multi-modal approaches to MIR

Methodology
    methodological issues and philosophical foundations
    evaluation methodology
    corpus creation
    legal, social and ethical issues

Domain knowledge
    representation of musical knowledge and meaning
    music perception and cognition
    computational music theory
    computational musicology and ethnomusicology

Musical features and properties
    melody and motives
    harmony, chords and tonality
    rhythm, beat, tempo
    structure, segmentation and form
    timbre, instrumentation and voice
    musical style and genre
    musical affect, emotion and mood
    expression and performative aspects of music

Music processing
    sound source separation
    music transcription and annotation
    optical music recognition
    alignment, synchronization and score following
    music summarization
    music synthesis and transformation
    fingerprinting
    automatic classification
    indexing and querying
    pattern matching and detection
    similarity metrics

Application
    user behavior and modelling
    user interfaces and interaction
    digital libraries and archives
    music retrieval systems
    music recommendation and playlist generation
    music and health, well-being and therapy
    music training and education
    MIR applications in music composition, performance and production
    music and gaming
    MIR in business and marketing

MIREX
The Music Information Retrieval Evaluation eXchange (MIREX) is an annual evaluation campaign for MIR algorithms, coupled to the ISMIR conference. Since it started in 2005, MIREX has fostered advancements both in specific areas of MIR and in the general understanding of how MIR systems and algorithms are to be evaluated. MIREX is to the MIR community what the Text Retrieval Conference (TREC) is to the text information retrieval community: A set of community-defined formal evaluations through which a wide variety of state-of-the-art systems, algorithms and techniques are evaluated under controlled conditions. MIREX is managed by the International Music Information Retrieval Systems Evaluation Laboratory (IMIRSEL) at the University of Illinois at Urbana-Champaign (UIUC).

Related conferences
 ACM Multimedia
 International Computer Music Conference (ICMC)
 International Conference on Acoustics, Speech, and Signal Processing (ICASSP)
 International Conference on Digital Audio Effects (DAFx)
 International Conference on New Interfaces for Musical Expression (NIME)
 International Symposium on Computer Music Modeling and Retrieval (CMMR)
 Sound and Music Computing Conference (SMC)

Related journals
 Computer Music Journal (CMJ)
 EURASIP Journal on Audio, Speech, and Music Processing
 IEEE/ACM Transactions on Audio, Speech, and Language Processing (TASLP)
 IEEE Transactions on Multimedia (TMM)
 Music Perception
 Journal of New Music Research (JNMR)

See also
 Audio Engineering Society
 Music Technology
 Sound and Music Computing

References

External links

 Audio and Acoustic Signal Processing

Music information retrieval
Computer science conferences
Music technology
Multimedia
Information retrieval organizations
Music search engines
Organizations established in 2008
2008 establishments in Canada